The perineal membrane is an anatomical term for a fibrous membrane in the perineum. The term "inferior fascia of urogenital diaphragm", used in older texts, is considered equivalent to the perineal membrane.

It is the superior border of the superficial perineal pouch, and the inferior border of the deep perineal pouch.

Structure
The perineal membrane is triangular in shape.  It attaches to both ischiopubic rami of the pelvis.  It also attaches to the perineal body. It is about 4 cm. in depth.

Its apex is directed forward, and is separated from the arcuate pubic ligament by an oval opening for the transmission of the deep dorsal vein of the penis or the deep dorsal vein of the clitoris.

Its lateral margins are attached on either side to the inferior rami of the pubis and ischium, above the crus penis.

Its base is directed toward the rectum, and connected to the central tendinous point of the perineum. The base is fused with both the pelvic fascia and Colle's fascia.

Relations
It is continuous with the deep layer of the superficial fascia behind the superficial transverse perineal muscle, and with the inferior layer of the diaphragmatic part of the pelvic fascia.

Perforations

In males, it is perforated, about 2.5 cm below the pubic symphysis, by the urethra, the aperture for which is circular and about 6 mm in diameter, by the arteries to the bulb, and the ducts of the bulbourethral glands close to the urethral orifice; by the deep arteries of the penis, one on either side close to the pubic arch, and about halfway along the attached margin of the fascia; by the dorsal arteries and nerves of the penis near the apex of the fascia. Its base is also perforated by the perineal vessels and nerves, while between its apex and the arcuate pubic ligament the deep dorsal vein of the penis passes upward into the pelvis.

Contents
If the inferior fascia of the urogenital diaphragm is detached on either side, the following structures will be seen between it and the superior fascia: 
 the deep dorsal vein of the penis
 the membranous portion of the urethra
 the deep transverse perineal muscle and the urethral sphincter muscles
 the bulbourethral glands and their ducts
 the pudendal arteries and dorsal nerves of the penis
 the arteries and nerves of the urethral bulb
 a plexus of veins

Additional images

References

External links
 

Perineum